Tribschen (also seen as Triebschen) is a district of the city of Lucerne, in the Canton of Lucerne in central Switzerland.

Tribschen is best known today as the home of the German composer Richard Wagner from 30 March 1866 to 22 April 1872. When Wagner was obliged to leave Munich in March 1866, he moved to a spacious villa in Tribschen on a headland projecting into Lake Lucerne. It was while he was living here that Wagner completed the score of Die Meistersinger von Nürnberg, composed his "Emperor March" and the third act of Siegfried, and began Götterdämmerung.

It was also at Tribschen that he composed his Siegfried Idyll as a birthday gift to his second wife, Cosima, who had recently given birth to the couple's first legitimate child, a son Siegfried. The couple had had two children while Cosima was married to conductor Hans von Bülow. The Siegfried Idyll was performed for the first time on Christmas morning, 25 December 1870, by an ensemble of fifteen players (among them Richter, Ruhoff, Rauchenecker and Kahl) on the stairs of the villa. It was a birthday present for Cosima; she had turned 33 the previous day, 24 December, but she always celebrated her birthday on Christmas Day. One of the guests present at this performance was the newly appointed 26-year-old Professor of Classical Philology at the University of Basel, Friedrich Nietzsche.

Today the villa is the Richard Wagner Museum.

References 

Lucerne
Richard Wagner